Jana Taylor (July 27, 1943 – April 27, 2004) was an American actress best known for her role as Angie Costello on the ABC soap opera General Hospital.

Early life
Taylor was born on July 27, 1943, in Far Rockaway, Queens, New York.

Career
She started her career in the 1961 film A Cold Wind in August as Alice. Also in 1961, Taylor was uncredited as Elsa Scheffler in 1961's Judgment at Nuremberg. She was Abigale in 1967's Hells Angels on Wheels. Taylor's last film was 1984's Dreamscape as Mrs. Webber. Her biggest role was Angie Costello in the ABC soap opera General Hospital from 1963 to 1965 as an original cast member. Taylor would guest star in such television series as Perry Mason,  The Gallant Men, Get Smart, Run for Your Life, The Wild Wild West, and The Interns. She had a recurring role on Make Room for Granddaddy as Susan McAdams Williams. Taylor ended her acting career with a guest appearance back on General Hospital on April 1, 1993, for its 30th anniversary.

Photography and philanthropy
Taylor had a production and photography studio located at 713 Palms Boulevard Venice, Los Angeles, 90291 since 1989. She was committed to showing disadvantaged children how to work a camera. Taylor's son now owns the business.

Personal life and death
Taylor married Michael R. Sinclair in 1969 and divorced him in 1970. She then married Louis Michael Perretta of Italian American descent in 1976. In that same year on December 10, they gave birth to rapper Michael "Evidence" Perretta, who is the lead member of his group Dilated Peoples. Taylor died on April 27, 2004, of cancer in Venice, Los Angeles.

Filmography

Film

Television

References

Sources

External links
 

1943 births
2004 deaths
Actresses from New York City
American television actresses
American soap opera actresses
20th-century American actresses
21st-century American women